Dmitry Borisovich Prusakov (born 31 July 1965, Moscow) is a Russian Egyptologist with Doktor nauk of history. He is a graduate of Bauman Moscow State Technical University, chief research officer at Institute of Oriental Studies RAN, member of the University of Chicago Oriental Institute and of the Egypt Exploration Society (London) and has participated in various archaeological expeditions. He investigates the socio-ecological history of the ancient world and is one of the leading Russian specialists in Predynastic and Early Dynastic Egypt.

Publications 
  Relationship between Man and Nature in Ancient Egypt, 1996.
   Nature and Man in Ancient Egypt  in  Series. Vol.14., 1999. 
  Origins of Islam. Acta Orientalia Academiae Scientiarum Hungaricae 53/3-4 (1999): 243—276 (with Vladimir   Klimenko and Andrey Korotayev).
 The Early State in Ancient Egypt  in   Series. Vol.19.,2001. 
  Ancient Egypt, 4th-2nd Millennium BC: Socio-Ecological Factors in the Evolution of Society and the State, 2001.
   Emergence of Islam: Socio-Cultural and Politico-anthropological Context (with Andrey Korotayev and Vladimir   Klimenko) 
  Ancient Egypt: Civilization of the Soil: A Study of the Neolithic Revolution.

Bibliography
 Sofia Miliband. Востоковеды России, XX — начало XXI века. — М., 2008. — Vol. 2. — pp. 208–209.

External links
 List of publications of D.B. Prysakov up to 2006 on Egyptology.ru (Russian)

Russian Egyptologists
1965 births
Living people
Bauman Moscow State Technical University alumni